Chris Drake (born January 5, 1981) is a former professional tennis player from the United States.

Biography
Originally from Boston, he is the son of former professional tennis player Bill Drake. His father was also a coach for highly ranked players including Tim Mayotte, Bud Schultz and Barbara Potter. It was at the age of 13 he began to concentrate on tennis, after previously also playing little-league baseball and soccer.

Drake played collegiate tennis at Brown University Bears while studying for a degree in modern American history. In 2001 he and teammate Ben Brier played the Bryan brothers in the Hall of Fame Tennis Championships in Newport, an ATP Tour tournament. By the time he graduated from Brown University in 2003 he had amassed 104 singles and 90 doubles wins. A two-time Bears captain, he led the team to its first-ever Ivy League Championship in 2002. He won the ITA Rafael Osuna Sportsmanship Award in 2003 and was twice named in the All-Ivy teams.

On the professional tour, Drake specialised in doubles and made it to 92 in the world. He made another appearance at Newport in 2006 and also played in the main draws of ATP Tour tournaments in Basel and Delray Beach. As a doubles player on the Challenger circuit he won a total of six tournaments.

From 2007 to 2010, he was the men's assistant coach at Northwestern University.

From 2010 to 2019, he was the head coach of the men's tennis team at Dartmouth College.

Since 2019, he has been the head coach of the men’s tennis team at Yale University.

Challenger titles

Doubles: (6)

References

External links
 
 

1981 births
Living people
American male tennis players
Tennis players from Boston
Brown Bears men's tennis players
Dartmouth Big Green men's tennis coaches
Northwestern Wildcats men's tennis coaches
American tennis coaches